Katsuaki (written: 勝晙, 勝昭, 勝明, 捷昭) is a masculine Japanese given name. Notable people with the name include:

Katsuaki Asai (born 1942), Japanese aikidoka
 (1784–1804), Japanese daimyō
, Japanese sumo wrestler
, Japanese cyclist
, Japanese karateka
, Japanese boxer
, Japanese modern pentathlete
, Japanese chief executive

Japanese masculine given names